Cnemaspis manoae, commonly known as Mano's day gecko, is a species of diurnal, rock-dwelling, insectivorous gecko endemic to  Sri Lanka.

Etymology
The gecko was named by Amarasinghe in recognition of his high school biology teacher, Mano Kalupahana, who encouraged him to study zoology.

References

manoae
Reptiles of Sri Lanka
Reptiles described in 2020